Funen County is a former county (Danish: amt) in central Denmark, comprising the islands of Funen, Langeland, Tåsinge, Ærø, and approximately 90 other islands, of which only 25 are inhabited.  The county was formed on 1 April 1970, comprising the former counties of Odense and Svendborg. The county was abolished from 1 January 2007, when it merged into Region of Southern Denmark (Region Syddanmark).

The county employed around 20,000 people working in more than 160 institutions located all over Funen.

Insignia
Funen County's coat of arms showed three connected gold hop leaves on a field of red, representing three former counties of Odense, Svendborg and Assens.  The choice of hop leaves comes from Funen native Hans Christian Andersen's song "I Danmark er jeg født" ("In Denmark I was born"), where he refers to Funen as "Æblegård og humlehave" (Apple farm and hop garden).

For common daily usage, a more modern and IT-friendly version was used. In this version, the background was green and the hop leaves white and much less detailed. Alternate versions had a red or, on occasion, a black background.

The coat of arms was registered in 1976.

List of County Mayors

Municipalities (1970-2006)

Municipal reform in 2006/2007
On 1 January 2007, The Danish Municipal Reform replaced the traditional counties with five new regions and cut the number of municipalities to 98. Funen county is included in the new Region Syddanmark (Region South Denmark). The 32 municipalities within Funen County were reduced to 10.

 Assens municipality  - Aarup, Assens, Glamsbjerg, Haarby, Tommerup, and Vissenbjerg
 Faaborg-Midtfyn municipality  - Årslev, Broby, Faaborg, Ringe, and Ryslinge
 Kerteminde municipality  - Kerteminde, Langeskov, and Munkebo
 Langeland municipality  - Rudkøbing, Sydlangeland, and Tranekær
 Middelfart municipality  - Ejby, Middelfart, and Nørre Aaby
 Odense municipality  (unchanged by the reform)
 Nordfyn municipality  - Bogense, Otterup, and Søndersø
 Nyborg municipality  - Nyborg, Ullerslev, and Ørbæk
 Svendborg municipality  - Egebjerg, Gudme, and Svendborg
 Ærø municipality  (formed 1 January 2006, a merger between Marstal and Ærøskøbing)

Important former municipalities
 Marstal municipality (1970-2005)
 Ærøskøbing municipality (1970-2005)

External links

Former counties of Denmark (1970–2006)
Region of Southern Denmark